AhangarKela (AhangarKala; , also Romanized as Āhangar Kolā and Āhangar Kalā) is a village in Gatab-e Jonubi Rural District, Gatab District, Babol County, Mazandaran Province, Iran. At the 2006 census, its population was 3,690, in 870 families.

References 

Populated places in Babol County